René Vanderwilt (born 23 May 1934) is a Belgian footballer. He played in three matches for the Belgium national football team from 1956 to 1958.

References

External links
 

1934 births
Living people
Belgian footballers
Belgium international footballers
Place of birth missing (living people)
Association footballers not categorized by position